Tom Harvey MBE is a BAFTA winning creative entrepreneur and writer.

Early life
Harvey was born outside Stevenage New Town; his father was sculptor Mark Harvey  and his grandfather was author William Fryer Harvey. He attended the Nobel School Stevenage and the London College of Printing, where he studied photography, film and television.

Career
Harvey is Chair of hip-hop dance theatre company BirdGang Ltd and a Trustee of Peter Marlow Foundation. Harvey was founder and CEO of London-based festival SohoCreate. The festival explored creativity and championed creative people and their work. Harvey was Chief Executive of Northern Film & Media, the creative industries development agency for North East England. The company invests in creative people, ideas and companies, working in film, television, web, mobile, games and music.

With North Star Ventures, Harvey helped raise £6m now invested in a range of film and tv projects.  Harvey is an Executive Producer on One Night in Turin directed by James Erskine, and feature films Rising Tide, No Place To Hide, Frank, directed by Richard Heslop and Unconditional, directed by Bryn Higgins.

Harvey began working in the media industry at David Puttnam's feature film company Enigma Productions. He then worked as an Assistant Director, Production Manager and Producer across a range of productions, including US and UK movies, television films and series, documentaries, short films and pop promos, including Happy Mondays and New Order, including their controversial promo Touched by the Hand of God, directed by Kathryn Bigelow.

He ran the Edinburgh International Television Festival for three years, developing the festival strands for young people, TVYP and TV25. He worked in senior management at the BBC as Commissions and Strategy Executive on BBC2 for Michael Jackson and as Manager of the Independent Commissioning Group for Jane Root. He was Managing Director of online interactive entertainment company XPT with Tim Wright and Rob Bevan.

As a playwright Harvey wrote the plays Pool "The Nature of Gravity" "Our Secret Home" "About Last Night" "Dead Dog" "Rich"  and Lydia about Henri Matisse’s final muse Lydia Delectorskaya. "Pool" won the Brockley Jack Theatre playwriting competition in 2014  and was produced by the Theatre in May/June 2014.  Verbatim play ABOUT LAST NIGHT on the 2017 general election, was performed at the Arcola Theatre with a cast including Monica Dolan and Helen Belbin. Harvey's short plays have been performed at The Park Theatre, The Jack, Theatre 503, Arts Theatre and The Cockpit. HER was selected for the ONE Festival at The Space Theatre and the FREE festival at Southwark Playhouse.

Harvey's was a short story finalist in the London Independent Story Prize and has had work published by Litro Magazine, Mercurious and The Wells Street Journal. 

Harvey is a Fellow 2007 of the Clore Leadership Programme, a graduate of Harvard Business School’s short course in Private Equity and Venture Capital 2009,  and a Common Purpose Graduate 2003.

Membership
Harvey is a member of BAFTA. He has an honours degree in film & TV, and in the past has served on the advisory board for IPPR North,  the Board of Culture North East and the management board of music accelerator Generator.

Awards
In the 2012 New Year Honours Harvey was awarded an MBE for services to the creative industries.

References

Living people
Year of birth missing (living people)
Place of birth missing (living people)
Members of the Order of the British Empire
People from Stevenage
Alumni of the London College of Printing
English dramatists and playwrights
British media executives